Nightshapes is a 1999 German drama film written and directed by Andreas Dresen. It was entered into the 49th Berlin International Film Festival where Michael Gwisdek won the Silver Bear for Best Actor.

Cast
 Myriam Abbas as Hanna
 Dominique Horwitz as Victor
 Oliver Breite as Jochen (as Oliver Bäßler)
 Susanne Bormann as Patty
 Michael Gwisdek as Peschke
 Ricardo Valentim as Feliz
 Ade Sapara as Ricardo
 Imogen Kogge as Rita
 Horst Krause as Taxifahrer / Cab Driver
 Axel Prahl as Polizist / Police Officer

References

External links

1999 films
1999 drama films
German drama films
1990s German-language films
Films directed by Andreas Dresen
1990s German films